The Calhoun Street Toll Supported Bridge (also known as the Trenton City Bridge) is a historic bridge connecting Calhoun Street in Trenton, New Jersey across the Delaware River to East Trenton Avenue in Morrisville, Bucks County, Pennsylvania, United States. It was constructed by the Phoenix Bridge Company of Phoenixville, Pennsylvania, in 1884.  The bridge was part of the Lincoln Highway until 1920 (when the highway was moved to the free Lower Trenton Bridge), and was later connected to Brunswick Circle by the Calhoun Street Extension as part of a bypass of downtown Trenton. Prior to 1940, trolleys of the Trenton-Princeton Traction Company, utilized this bridge to cross into Pennsylvania. The bridge is owned by the Delaware River Joint Toll Bridge Commission, and is maintained with tolls from other bridges.

On May 24, 2010, the bridge completely closed to vehicular and pedestrian traffic to undergo much-needed renovations including truss repair and repainting, deck replacement, and repair of approaches. The rehabilitation project was completed October 8, 2010, and the bridge was rededicated in a ceremony on October 12.

The bridge helps connect segments of the East Coast Greenway, a  trail system connecting Maine to Florida.

Restrictions

See also
List of crossings of the Delaware River
National Register of Historic Places listings in Mercer County, New Jersey

References

External links

Bridge Maker's Signs or Plates - Calhoun Street Bridge
, includes the Calhoun Street Bridge

1884 establishments in New Jersey
1884 establishments in Pennsylvania
Bridges over the Delaware River
Bridges completed in 1884
Road bridges on the National Register of Historic Places in Pennsylvania
Road bridges on the National Register of Historic Places in New Jersey
Bridges in Bucks County, Pennsylvania
Bridges in Mercer County, New Jersey
Buildings and structures in Trenton, New Jersey
Delaware River Joint Toll Bridge Commission
Lincoln Highway
National Register of Historic Places in Trenton, New Jersey
Historic American Engineering Record in New Jersey
Historic American Engineering Record in Pennsylvania
Former toll bridges in New Jersey
Former toll bridges in Pennsylvania
Pratt truss bridges in the United States
Metal bridges in the United States
Interstate vehicle bridges in the United States